Mounted Volunteers; 2nd Brigade of the California State Militia was organized in Humboldt County, California on 9 September 1861.

The company of Mounted Volunteers was mustered to protect citizens and property from hostile Indians during the Bald Hills War.  In three months, the Indians were controlled and placed on the Federal Reservation on the Smith River and the company was mustered out.

See also
List of California State Militia civil war units

References 

Bald Hills War
Military history of California
California Z
Military units and formations established in 1861
1861 establishments in California